"Outside" is a song by Scottish DJ and record producer Calvin Harris, featuring English singer Ellie Goulding, from Harris's fourth studio album, Motion (2014). It was released on 20 October 2014 as the album's fourth single. The song also appears on the deluxe edition of Goulding's third studio album, Delirium (2015). "Outside" marks the second collaboration between Harris and Goulding, following the single "I Need Your Love" (2013).

Composition
With a tempo of 128 beats per minute, "Outside" is composed in the key of D minor. It follows a chord progression of B♭-Gm-Dm-C.

Critical reception
The song received positive reviews from music critics, calling it a great follow-up of their previous collaboration, and noting it as a highlight of the album. Brent Faulkner of PopMatters praised the song as "one of Motions crème de la crème records" and wrote that it "latches from a first listen giving the set arguably its strongest pop hit." Kyle Anderson of Entertainment Weekly commented that on "Outside", Harris "finds the perfect balance between [Goulding's] vulnerable warble and the warping synths underneath". Idolator's Robbie Daw found the song to be "just as pleasant, if not slightly more so, than Calvin and Ellie's previous outing together, 2012's 'I Need Your Love.' It's good to hear that there's still quite a bit of musical magic when these two hit the studio together."

Carolyn Menyes of Music Times stated, "There's something that works so well about Harris' string effect synth beats and Goulding's whispered ethereal voice. We've heard it before in 'I Need Your Love' and it's back here again in full force for yet another magical combination." Heather Phares of AllMusic felt that the track "doesn't quite recapture the magic of [Harris and Goulding's] previous work but does make the most of her deceptively powerful soprano, this time in a more upbeat setting." Slant Magazines James Rainis opined that "[t]he most notable characteristic of 'Outside' [...] is that the hook's cadence is exactly the same as the Carly Rae Jepsen/Owl City song 'Good Time,' but it lacks that song's cutesy charm." Chase Hunt of AXS viewed the song as "a decent pairing but an expected outcome."

Commercial performance
"Outside" entered and peaked at number six on the UK Singles Chart, selling 28,902 copies in its first week. It remained at number six the following week, selling 35,590 copies. In its third week, the song fell to number 10 with 33,208 copies sold.

In the United States, "Outside" became Harris's eighth number-one single on Billboards Dance/Mix Show Airplay chart for the week ending 7 March 2015, surpassing both David Guetta and Madonna, who along with Harris were tied with seven. It also gives Goulding her third number-one on this chart. On the Billboard Hot 100, the song peaked at number 29, making it Harris's eighth and Goulding's fifth top-40 single.

Music video
The music video for "Outside" was directed by Emil Nava and filmed in Los Angeles on 20 October 2014. The video premiered on 12 November 2014. The video depicts two separate couples in toxic and abusive relationships. Harris and Goulding each play partners in the separate relationships who both appear to be the chief recipient of the abuse. The video is also intercut with shots of Goulding singing directly to the camera in front of a suburban house, surreal images that bend the fore- and background, objects in the frame freezing in time, Goulding being suspended in the air, and Goulding with a floating rectangular mirror that eventually shatters. The video ends with Goulding and Harris together in the house in the midst of a mid-fight freeze frame, leaving the viewer to question which version was reality.

Track listings

Credits and personnel
Credits adapted from the liner notes of Motion.

Recording
 Recorded at Fly Eye Studio (London)
 Mastered at The Exchange Mastering Studios (London)

Personnel
 Calvin Harris – all instruments, production, mixing
 Ellie Goulding – vocals
 Simon Davey – mastering

Charts

Weekly charts

Year-end charts

Certifications

Release history

Notes

References

2014 songs
2014 singles
Calvin Harris songs
Columbia Records singles
Ellie Goulding songs
Number-one singles in Finland
Number-one singles in Germany
Number-one singles in Hungary
Number-one singles in Poland
Songs written by Calvin Harris
Songs written by Ellie Goulding